The Denver Sheriff Department is a criminal justice agency based in Denver, Colorado, United States. The department is responsible for the care and custody of inmates within Denver's jail system, for the city's court services, and other responsibilities assigned by the executive director of safety.  Unlike the Denver Police Department, the Denver Sheriffs are not responsible for patrol or investigations. The department is overseen by the executive director of safety and the sheriff; both positions are appointed by the mayor. Denver's Sheriff is appointed by the Mayor of Denver; This is unique in Colorado, as all other county sheriffs are elected, although in the City & County of Broomfield, Colorado, the Chief of Police oversees the "sheriff function".

As of September 2016, the agency employed more than 985 sworn and civilian members.

History

The Denver Sheriff Department was established on December 2, 1902, at the same time as the City and County of Denver. The department was tasked with providing security in the courts, court related services and the county jail. Later duties were given to the department.

The current county jail opened in 1956 and has undergone many changes to the telephone pole construction with large cell houses to modern day direct supervision pods. Ninety percent of the original county jail has been razed to accommodate the new buildings.

One of the most famous duties of the department was the placement of Denver Boot, a non-destructive device that prevents a vehicle in with a parking violation from leaving by preventing one or more wheels from functioning. The "boot" was invented by Denverite Frank Marugg, who was a musician with the Denver Symphony Orchestra in 1953. The police had the detail at first, however was given to the sheriff departments Court Services Division. The duties of placing the boot on vehicles was given to Denver's Parking Management in the late 1980s.

In 1951, the City Jail was manned by deputy sheriffs removing the police officers for street duties. Police commanders supervised deputy sheriffs until 1968 when command was fully given to sheriff officials. The City Jail was located on the 4th floor of the police headquarters located at 13th & Champa Sts. In 1978, a new police headquarters and city jail was opened at 13th & Cherokee Sts. The Pre Arraignment Detention Facility (PADF) served as the main booking facility until the new Downtown Detention Center opened. DDC is named after a Denver District Attorney (Phillip Van Sise) and Denver's longest serving undersheriff (Louis John Simonet). Simonet official title was Director of Corrections & Undersheriff and was the executive head of the department for eighteen years. In 2013, the title of sheriff was given to the executive head of the department. Denver does not have a statutory undersheriff as in other counties. The 2013 shake up called for the Manager of Safety/Ex Officio Sheriff to become the Executive Director of Public Safety, thus no longer being the "sheriff" of Denver. The Director still oversees the operation of the fire, police and sheriff departments.

Misconduct

In July 2010, suspect Marvin Louis Booker was tackled by five sheriff's deputies, put in a headlock, handcuffed, and then tased. Shortly after, he went into cardio-respiratory arrest and died. The City and County of Denver did not bring criminal charges against the officers. However, in a civil trial in 2014, the officers were found liable, and the Booker family was awarded $4.65 million in damages.

In October 2012, Deputy Bruce Mitchell released Elvie Bellamy, an inmate who was supposed to be transferred to another facility. The jail staff did not notify the police or other agencies, instead attempting to recapture the prisoner themselves. They arrested, then released, another man who resembled Bellamy. This was the third time Deputy Mitchell had mistakenly released a prisoner. He was suspended for four weeks.

In December 2013, a report by Nicholas Mitchell, Denver's independent monitor, indicated that the department had not been investigating all allegations of prisoner abuse at the jail, as required by law. The report also indicated that the jail staff used tasers on uncooperative prisoners.

In January 2014, Deputy Matthew Andrews was sentenced to six years in prison for helping a prisoner escape from jail. Andrews allowed the prisoner to wear his uniform to leave the facility.

In February 2014, Deputy Brady Lovingier was suspended for thirty days after an unprovoked attack on a heavily-restrained prisoner two years earlier. The attack took place in front of a judge, in a courtroom, and was recorded on video. Lovingier, the son of the previous sheriff, appealed his suspension. While awaiting a decision on his appeal, Lovingier was assigned to train other deputies on the use of force. In an official statement, Sheriff Gary Wilson said he did not know Lovingier was teaching the class.

In late July 2014, Sheriff Wilson resigned under pressure from the mayor to end abuse at the jail. In 2018, Wilson left the Department to pursue a real estate career.

In August 2019, Diana Sanchez filed a lawsuit in U.S. District Court claiming that she was forced to give birth to her son alone in her cell without medical supervision or treatment, despite repeatedly telling the jail’s staff that she was having contractions. Her suit alleges that instead of “ensuring that Ms. Sanchez was able to give birth in a safe and sanitary medical setting,” nurses and deputies “callously made her labor alone for hours,” forcing her to endure a “horrific experience”. Moments after the baby's birth, a male nurse is seen on camera walking into the cell and taking the baby boy away. It was reported that he had been watching the incident from outside the cell instead of providing help during the child birth.

Achievements

Denver Deputy Sheriffs have been involved in security details for World Youth Day 1993, the 1997 G-8 Summit, and the 2008 Democratic National Convention.

On November 20, 2013, the National Sheriff's Association presented the Triple Crown Award to the Denver Sheriff Department, making it one of only 35 sheriff's departments to receive the award since it was established in 1993. The Triple Crown Award recognizes sheriff's offices that achieve simultaneous accreditation from the Commission on Accreditation for Law Enforcement Agencies, the American Correctional Association, and the National Commission on Correctional Health Care.

See also

 List of law enforcement agencies in Colorado

References

External links
 Denver Sheriff Department
 Denver Sheriff Department 2014 Annual Report
 Denver Behind Bars, The History of the Denver Sheriff Department, Lenny Ortiz, 

Government of Denver
Sheriffs' departments of Colorado
Organizations based in Denver
1902 establishments in Colorado